Nyamapanda (Other names: Nyamapande, Nyamapanda Customs Post) is a town in the Mashonaland East Province of northern Zimbabwe. It is a border post for crossing between Zimbabwe and Mozambique. The border post on the Mozambique side is Cochemane. A dam on the Nyamapande River (Inyapandi River) just upstream from the town provides for irrigation.

Notes

Populated places in Mashonaland East Province